Knattspyrnufélagið Hlíðarendi, commonly known as KH, is a football club, based in Reykjavík, Iceland. It plays its home games at Hlíðarendi. It fields both men's and women's team and is affiliated with Knattspyrnufélagið Valur.

Men's football
KH men's football team debuted in the Icelandic tournament and the Icelandic Cup in 2011. In 2017, it was promoted to the 3. deild karla after beating Kórdrengir in the promotion playoffs. In 2019, Hallgrímur Dan Daníelsson and Birkir Már Sævarsson where hired as managers of the team.

Trophies and achievements
4. deild karla
 Winners: 2017
 Winners: 2021 (undefeated)

Notable players
  Matthías Guðmundsson
  Sigurbjörn Örn Hreiðarsson

Women's football
The women's team debuted in the 1. deild kvenna during the 2016 season, when it finished 6th in Group A. It did not participate the next four seasons but returned ahead of the 2021 season in cooperation with Valur.

Notable players
  Ásta Árnadóttir

References

External links
 Club profile at Football Association of Iceland

KH
KH
Capital Region (Iceland)
Úrvalsdeild Women clubs